The Aptakisic-Tripp School District is a school district in Lake County, Illinois. It operates four schools and covers grades Early Childhood through 8. Most students live in Buffalo Grove, a northern suburb of Chicago, and some live in unincorporated Prairie View or Deerfield.

Schools

There are two K-3 schools, Tripp Elementary School and Pritchett Elementary School, in the district. Pritchett School also houses Pre-K classrooms for three- and four-year-old students who reside within District 102 boundaries. There is one middle school for grades 4–5, which is named Meridian School. Early Childhood is also in Meridian. The junior high school, grades 6–8, is named Aptakisic Junior High School. Students who live within the district's boundaries will attend Adlai E. Stevenson High School in Lincolnshire; Stevenson is its own independent district, Adlai E. Stevenson High School District 125.

History

The district was originally split into the Aptakisic School and the Tripp School during the 19th century and first half of the 20th century. Due to the growth of the city of Buffalo Grove, the schools united into one in the 1960s. Along with a united district came a brand-new school. By the 1970s, the school was unable to handle the growing city and the school was torn down and the Aptakisic School replaced it. By 1981, grades K-5 began going to the new Pritchett Elementary School. In the late 1980s, Tripp Middle School was built serving grades 3–5, at which point Pritchett Elementary served only grades K-2. Aptakisic School was then a junior high serving grades 6, 7, and 8. By 1994, Meridian Middle School was built to handle grade 5 and 6, while Tripp Elementary School became an elementary school serving K-4, alongside Pritchett. 

Expansion during 2017-2018 brought many changes. The district office that was a part of AJHS building moved to a neighboring building. The old district office was redesigned to be the sixth grade classrooms. A new wing was built for music, art, Spanish, band and orchestra. An Early Childhood wing was built for Meridian. Fourth grades from Tripp and Pritchett were moved to Meridian. Sixth grade moved to AJHS from Meridian. Tripp and Pritchett became K-3 schools.

In Fiction

Adam Levin's 2010 novel The Instructions is set at Aptakisic Junior High School.

References

External links
 

Buffalo Grove, Illinois
School districts in Lake County, Illinois
School districts established in 1956
1956 establishments in Illinois